The 2019–20 Indiana Hoosiers women's basketball team represented Indiana University Bloomington during the 2019–20 NCAA Division I women's basketball season. The Hoosiers were led by sixth-year head coach Teri Moren and played their home games at Simon Skjodt Assembly Hall as a member of the Big Ten Conference.

Roster

Notre Dame}}

Schedule

|-
!colspan=9 style=| Exhibition

|-
!colspan=9 style=| Non-conference regular season

|-
!colspan=9 style=| Big Ten regular Season

|-
!colspan=9 style=| Big Ten Women's Tournament

Rankings

See also
 2019–20 Indiana Hoosiers men's basketball team

References

Indiana Hoosiers women's basketball seasons
Indiana
Indiana Hoosiers
Indiana Hoosiers